York—Scarborough was an Ontario provincial electoral district that existed from 1955 to 1963. It occupied the entire area of the former borough of Scarborough. In 1963 it was split between four new ridings: Scarborough North, Scarborough East, Scarborough Centre and Scarborough West.

Members of Provincial Parliament

Election results

References

Notes

Citations

Former provincial electoral districts of Ontario
Provincial electoral districts of Toronto